Telephlebia cyclops is a species of dragonfly in the family Telephlebiidae,
known as the northern evening darner. 
It is a medium to large, dark chestnut brown dragonfly with dark markings on the leading edge of its wings.
It is endemic to eastern Australia, where it has been found at tropical waterfalls,
and flies at dusk.

Telephlebia cyclops appears similar to Telephlebia godeffroyi.

Gallery

See also
 List of Odonata species of Australia

References

Telephlebiidae
Odonata of Australia
Endemic fauna of Australia
Taxa named by Robert John Tillyard
Insects described in 1916